Tabora Airport   is an airport in west-central Tanzania serving Tabora. Surface access from Tabora is via the tarmac Tabora to Ndembelwa village road, and then a three kilometre airport access tarmac road. Adjacent to the airport is the Tabora Command Military Base 202.

History
The former dirt strip of the Tabora Airport was improved and lengthened in 1942 during World War II. The South African Air Force supervised the work and built the hangar and the control tower. The airport was needed as a relay station for airborne supplies and troops destined for the North African desert campaign.

Facilities
Runway 08/26 is used as a taxiway to the terminal and hangar; there is no separate taxiway. The existing apron has a tarmac surface.

The airport has a terminal building, with a separate fire-suppression building. The airport manager has his office in a separate building. There is a hangar, a motor vehicle garage, and the control tower.  The car park has a gravel surface. There are plans to pave the main runway and apron with asphalt (bitumen) and resurface the gravel on the alternate runway.

Airlines and destinations

See also

List of airports in Tanzania
Transport in Tanzania

References

External links
OpenStreetMap - Tabora Airport

Airports in Tanzania
Buildings and structures in the Tabora Region